Maundy (from Old French mandé, from Latin mandatum meaning "command"), or Washing of the Saints' Feet, Washing of the Feet, or Pedelavium or Pedilavium, is a religious rite observed by various Christian denominations. The Latin word mandatum is the first word sung at the ceremony of the washing of the feet, "Mandatum novum do vobis ut diligatis invicem sicut dilexi vos", from the text of John 13:34 in the Vulgate ("I give you a new commandment, That ye love one another as I have loved you"). This is also seen as referring to the commandment of Christ that believers should emulate his loving humility in the washing of the feet. The term mandatum (mandé, maundy), therefore, was applied to the rite of foot-washing on the Thursday preceding Easter Sunday, called Maundy Thursday.

John 13:2–17 recounts Jesus' performance of this action. In verses 13:14–17, He instructs His disciples:

Footwashing was practiced by the early Church, prior to receiving the Eucharist, and was recorded by the early Christian apologist Tertullian, who discussed it involving a basin of "water for the saints' feet", along with a "linen towel".

Many denominations (including Anglicans, Lutherans, Methodists, Presbyterians, Mennonites, and Catholics) therefore observe the liturgical washing of the feet on Maundy Thursday of Holy Week. Moreover, for some denominations, foot-washing was an example, a pattern. Many groups throughout Church history and many modern denominations have practiced foot washing as a church ordinance including Adventists, Anabaptists, Baptists, Free Will Baptists, and Pentecostals.

Background 
The root of this practice is to be found in the hospitality customs of ancient civilizations, especially where sandals were the chief footwear. A host would provide water for guests to wash their feet, provide a servant to wash the feet of the guests or even serve the guests by washing their feet. This is mentioned in several places in the Old Testament of the Bible (e.g. Genesis ; ; ; ; I Samuel ; et al.), as well as other religious and historical documents. A typical Eastern host might bow, greet, and kiss his guest, then offer water to allow the guest to wash his feet or have servants do it. Though the wearing of sandals might necessitate washing the feet, the water was also offered as a courtesy even when shoes were worn.

I Samuel  is the first biblical passage where an honored person offers to wash feet as a sign of humility. In John 12, Mary of Bethany anointed Jesus' feet presumably in gratitude for raising her brother Lazarus from the dead, and in preparation for his death and burial. The Bible records washing of the saint's feet being practised by the primitive church in I Timothy  perhaps in reference to piety, submission and/or humility. There are several names for this practice: maundy, foot washing, washing the saints' feet, pedilavium, and mandatum.

The foot washing, described in the thirteenth chapter of the Gospel of John, is concerned with the Latin title of Servus servorum dei ("Servant of the Servant of God"), which was historically reserved to the Bishops and to the Pope, also called the Bishop of Rome. Jesus Christ, the Son of God, commissioned the Twelve to be Servant of the Servant of God, and this calling to the Imitation of Christ has been firstly extended to all the bishops of the Church as the direct successors of the Apostles. The Apostles received the Holy Spirit from Jesus in the gospel of John chapter 20.22 and in fullness upon the day of the Pentecost in chapter 2 of the Book of Acts, for the evangelization and salvation of all the human race. This belief is common to Catholics, to some denominations of the Western Christianity, and is consistent and in keeping with Eastern Christian beliefs.

It is also recalled in the Latin text of the Magnificat, for which God "regarded the lowliness" of Mary, Mother of Jesus, and, by effect of that, "magnified" her ("He hath put down the mighty from their seat: and hath exalted the humble and meek."). God also did the same to all the other creatures, both before and after the Incarnation, for: 
 all the angels: the Satan's mighty pride to be like God made him the fallen angel before the starting of the creation, and also it was punished with the promised mission of a woman (Mary), a Servant of God, which would have bruise his head. On the opposite side, the lowliness of St Michael the Archangel made him the head of the hierarchy of angels; 

Biblical reference 

Jesus demonstrates the custom of the time when he comments on the lack of hospitality in one Pharisee's home by not providing water to wash his feet in Luke 7:44:

History 
The rite of foot washing finds its roots in scripture, where Jesus tells his followers "to wash one another's feet" (cf. ). After the death of the apostles or the end of the Apostolic Age, the practice was continued.

Footwashing was practiced in the early centuries of post-apostolic Christianity, with Tertullian (145–220) mentioning the practice as being a part of Christian worship in his De Corona. Footwashing was done with a basin "of water for the saints' feet" and a "linen towel", prior to the reception of the Eucharist. Additionally, in the 1st century, Christian women went to locations in which marginalized people resided (such as prisons) and washed their feet. The early Church Father Clement of Alexandria linked the new sandals given by to Prodigal Son with feetwashing, describing "non-perishable shoes that are only fit to be worn by those who have had their feet washed by Jesus, the Teacher and Lord." The early Church thus saw footwashing to be connected to repentance, involving a spiritual cleansing by Jesus. 

Around 256 AD, Cyprian, the bishop of Carthage, wrote about footwashing teaching "the hands how to act in service".

It was practiced by the Church at Milan (c. 380) and is mentioned by the Council of Elvira (300). The Church Fathers Origen, as well as John Chrysostom and Augustine (c. 400) encouraged the practice as an imitation of Christ.

Observance of foot washing at the time of baptism was maintained in Africa, Gaul, Germany, Milan, northern Italy, and Ireland.

According to the Mennonite Encyclopedia "St. Benedict's Rule (529) for the Benedictine Order prescribed hospitality feetwashing in addition to a communal feetwashing for humility"; a statement confirmed by the Catholic Encyclopedia. It apparently was established in the Roman church, though not in connection with baptism, by the 8th century.

The Greek Orthodox Church counted footwashing among the sacraments, though it was not practiced that often.

The Synod of Toledo (694) "declared that footwashing should be observed on Maundy Thursday" and Roman Catholic churches thus came to observe footwashing on that day.

The Albigenses and the Waldenses' practiced footwashing as a rite.

There is some evidence that it was observed by the early Hussites; and the practice was a meaningful part of the 16th century radical reformation, which resulted in Anabaptist denominations regularly practicing footwashing as an ordinance.

Denominations practicing ritual feet washing
The ritual washing of feet is currently practiced in many religious denominations including those listed below.

Roman Catholic
In Catholic Church, the ritual washing of feet is now associated with the Mass of the Lord's Supper, which celebrates in a special way the Last Supper of Jesus, before which he washed the feet of his twelve apostles.

Evidence for the practice on this day goes back at least to the latter half of the 12th century, when "the pope washed the feet of twelve sub-deacons after his Mass and of thirteen poor men after his dinner."  From 1570 to 1955, the Roman Missal printed, after the text of the Holy Thursday Mass, a rite of washing of feet unconnected with the Mass. For many years Pius IX performed the foot washing in the sala over the portico of Saint Peter's, Rome.

In 1955 Pope Pius XII revised the ritual and inserted it into the Mass. Since then, the rite is celebrated after the homily that follows the reading of the gospel account of how Jesus washed the feet of his twelve apostles. Some persons who have been selected – usually twelve, but the Roman Missal does not specify the number – are led to chairs prepared in a suitable place. The priest goes to each and, with the help of the ministers, pours water over each one's feet and dries them. There are some advocates of restricting this ritual to clergy or at least men.

In a notable break from the 1955 norms, Pope Francis washed the feet of two women and Muslims at a juvenile detention center in Rome 2013. In 2016 it was announced that the Roman Missal had been revised to permit women to have their feet washed on Maundy Thursday; previously it permitted only males to do so. In 2016 Catholic priests around the world washed both women's and men's feet on Holy Thursday "their gesture of humility represented to many the progress of inclusion in the Catholic church."

At one time, most of the European monarchs also performed the Washing of Feet in their royal courts on Maundy Thursday, a practice continued by the Austro-Hungarian Emperor and the King of Spain up to the beginning of the 20th century (see Royal Maundy). In 1181 Roger de Moulins, Grand Master of the Knights Hospitaller issued a statute declaring, "In Lent every Saturday, they are accustomed to celebrate maundy for thirteen poor persons, and to wash their feet, and to give to each a shirt and new breeches and new shoes, and to three chaplains, or to three clerics out of the thirteen, three deniers and to each of the others, two deniers".

Lutheran, Anglican and Methodist

Foot washing rites are practiced by many Lutheran, Anglican and Methodist churches, whereby foot washing is most often experienced in connection with Maundy Thursday services and, sometimes, at ordination services where the Bishop may wash the feet of those who are to be ordained. In certain Methodist connexions, such as the Missionary Methodist Church and the New Congregational Methodist Church, footwashing is practiced at the time that the Lord's Supper is celebrated.

Though history shows that foot washing has at times been practiced in connection with baptism, and at times as a separate occasion, by far its most common practice has been in connection with the Lord's supper service. There has been some revival of the practice as other liturgical churches have also rediscovered the practice.

Eastern Orthodox and Byzantine Catholic

The Eastern Orthodox and Eastern Catholic Churches practice the ritual of the Washing of Feet on Holy and Great Thursday (Maundy Thursday) according to their ancient rites. The service may be performed either by a bishop, washing the feet of twelve priests; or by an Hegumen (Abbot) washing the feet of twelve members of the brotherhood of his monastery. The ceremony takes place at the end of the Divine Liturgy.

After Holy Communion, and before the dismissal, the brethren all go in procession to the place where the Washing of Feet is to take place (it may be in the center of the nave, in the narthex, or a location outside). After a psalm and some troparia (hymns) an ektenia (litany) is recited, and the bishop or abbot reads a prayer. Then the deacon reads the account in the Gospel of John, while the clergy perform the roles of Christ and his apostles as each action is chanted by the deacon. The deacon stops when the dialogue between Jesus and Peter begins. The senior-ranking clergyman among those whose feet are being washed speaks the words of Peter, and the bishop or abbot speaks the words of Jesus. Then the bishop or abbot himself concludes the reading of the Gospel, after which he says another prayer and sprinkles all of those present with the water that was used for the foot washing. The procession then returns to the church and the final dismissal is given as normal.

Oriental Orthodox

Foot washing rites are also observed in the Oriental Orthodox churches on Maundy Thursday.

In the Coptic Orthodox Church the service is performed by the parish priest. He blesses the water for the foot washing with the cross, just as he would for blessing holy water and he washes the feet of the entire congregation.

In the Syrian Orthodox Church, this service is performed by a bishop or priest. There will be some 12 selected men, both priests and the lay people, and the bishop or priest will wash and kiss the feet of those 12 men. It is not merely a dramatization of the past event. Further it is a prayer where the whole congregation prays to wash and cleanse them of their sins.

Moravian
The Moravian Church has historically practiced footwashing (pedelavium). This reflected the emphasis Moravians place on practicing customs of the early Church, such as the Lovefeast. In 1818, the practice was made no longer compulsory, though it continues in the present-day. Traditionally, Moravian Christians practiced footwashing before partaking in the Lord's Supper, although in most Moravian congregations, these rites are observed chiefly on Maundy Thursday.

Anabaptist
Groups descending from the 1708 Schwarzenau Brethren, such as the Grace Brethren, Church of the Brethren, Brethren Church, Brethren in Christ,  Old German Baptist Brethren, and the Dunkard Brethren regularly practice foot washing (generally called "feetwashing") as one of three ordinances that compose their Lovefeast, the others being the Eucharist and a fellowship meal.  Historically related groups such as the Amish and most Mennonites also wash feet, tracing the practice to the 1632 Dordrecht Confession of Faith. For members, this practice promotes humility towards and care for others, resulting in a higher egalitarianism among members.

Baptist

Many Baptists observe the literal washing of feet as a third ordinance.  The communion and foot washing service is practiced regularly by members of the Separate Baptists in Christ, General Association of Baptists, Free Will Baptists, Primitive Baptists, Union Baptists, Old Regular Baptist, Christian Baptist Church of God. Feet washing is also practiced as a third ordinance by many Southern Baptists, General Baptists, and Independent Baptists.

Pentecostal
Various Pentecostal denominations practice the ordinance or ritual of footwashing, in connection with the sacrament of the Lord's Supper or Communion, in the past. Often, foot washing is held as an optional service separate from communion on a different date. When celebrated in conjunction with the Sacrament of the Lord's Supper, or communion, the Pastor, or designated minister, will read the scriptural text, out of the Gospel of St. John, then instruct the men to assemble in one location of the church, and the women to assemble in another location of the church - where basins with water and towels have already been suitably prepared in front of a pew, or row of chairs. Each member takes turns sitting in a chair or pew while another kneels before him or her and washes their feet.  Customs may vary. Sometimes the foot washer places both of the other persons feet into the water, scooping water over them with his/her hand, simply holding them, sometimes the feet are held over the basin while water is poured over them, and in some congregations, only one foot is made bare and has water poured over it/washed.  Often, the person whose feet are being washed lays a hand/or hands upon the shoulder of the person washing their feet and he or she will pray for the person washing their feet. The foot washer also prays for humility and for the person they are washing.  When all have participated in washing the feet of others and having their feet washed, a benediction and dismissal of the service is conducted. Members are often instructed to continue their service to others in the church and to the world at large.  After the dismissal, participates usually  participate in helping clean up the area, basins, etc.

Latter-day Saint Movement

In the mid-1830s, Joseph Smith introduced the original temple rites of the Latter Day Saint movement in Kirtland, Ohio, which primarily involved foot washing, followed by speaking in tongues and visions. This foot washing took place exclusively among men, and was based upon the Old and New Testament. After Joseph Smith was initiated into the first three degrees of Freemasonry, this was adapted into the whole body Endowment ritual more similar to contemporary Mormon practice, which shares some similiarites to Masonic temple rites, and does not specifically involve the feet.

In 1843, Smith included a foot washing element in the faith's second anointing ceremony in which elite married couples are anointed as heavenly monarchs and priests.

The observance of washing the saints' feet is quite varied, but a typical service follows the partaking of unleavened bread and wine. Deacons (in many cases) place pans of water in front of pews that have been arranged for the service. The men and women participate in separate groups, men washing men's feet and women washing women's feet. Each member of the congregation takes a turn washing the feet of another member. Each foot is placed one at a time into the basin of water, is washed by cupping the hand and pouring water over the foot, and is dried with a long towel girded around the waist of the member performing the washing. Most of these services appear  to be quite moving to the participants.

Restorationist
Like the other two sacraments, namely Baptism and the Lord's Supper, members of the church believe that footwashing imparts salvific grace to the recipient—in this case, to have a part with Christ.

Most Church of God denominations also include footwashing in their Passover ceremony based on John 13:1–11.

Seventh-day Adventist
Most Seventh-day Adventist congregations schedule an opportunity for foot washing preceding each quarterly (four times a year) Communion service. As with their "open" Communion, all believers in attendance, not just members or pastors, are invited to share in the washing of feet with another: men with men, women with women, and frequently, spouse with spouse. This service is alternatively called the Ordinance of Foot-Washing or the Ordinance of Humility. Its primary purpose is to renew the cleansing that only comes from Christ, but secondarily to seek and celebrate reconciliation with another member before Communion/the Lord's Supper.

Progressive Judaism
A number of Jewish rabbis who disagree with the initiation custom of brit milah, or circumcision of a male baby, instead have offered brit shalom, or a multi-part naming ceremony which eschews circumcision. One portion of the ritual, Brit rechitzah, involves the washing of the baby's feet.

See also 
 Christ Washing the Disciples' Feet (Tintoretto)
 Washing of feet and farewell (The Last Supper in Christian Art)
 Water and religion
 Ablution in Christianity

Notes

References 
 
 Historical and Informational
 Appalachian Mountain Religion: a History, by Deborah Vansau McCauley
 Catholic Encyclopedia, Charles G. Herbermann, Edward A. Pace, Condé B. Pallen, Thomas J. Shahan, and John J. Wynne, editors
 Eerdman's Handbook to the History of Christianity, Tim Dowley, et al., editors
 Encyclopedia of Religion in the South, Samuel S. Hill, editor
 Foxfire 7, Paul F. Gillespie, editor
 Manners and Customs of Bible Lands, by Fred H. Wight
 Mennonite Encyclopedia (Vol. 2), Cornelius J. Dyck, Dennis D. Martin, et al., editors
 Historical and Theological (con)
 Footwashing by the Master and by the Saints, by Elam J. Daniels
 Manual of Church Order (ch. 6), by J. L. Dagg
 Historical and Theological (pro)
 The Washing of the Saints' Feet, by J. Matthew Pinson (Randall House, 2006)
 A Free Will Baptist Handbook: Heritage, Beliefs, and Ministries, by J. Matthew Pinson
 Baptist Doctrine: the Doctrine of Foot Washing, by R. L. Vaughn
 Footwashing in John 13 and the Johannine Community, by John Christopher Thomas
 Washing the Saints' Feet shown to be an Ordinance of Christ, by Joseph Sorsby

See also

External links

 Anabaptists and Footwashing – a series of articles on history and current practice among Mennonites, Grace Brethren and Church of the Brethren.
 
 Footwashing as an act of building community – a Brethren viewpoint
 How to conduct a foot-washing service – a liturgical viewpoint
 Footwashing as a Means of Grace (a United Methodist approach) by Gregory S. Neal
 Washing of the Feet : Hidden Significance of the Gnostic story in the Fourth Gospel
 Primitive Baptist FAQ:  Feet Washing
 The Footwashing Ritual and the Sacrament of Holy Orders: A New Look at John 13 – a Catholic viewpoint of the import of footwashing as relates to the sacrament of Holy Orders.
 Washing of Feet on Maundy Thursday Armenian Apostolic Church
 Gaining a Dose Of Humility, One Washed Foot at a Time article from The Washington Post, 2 April 2006
 

Barefoot
Gestures of respect
Gospel of John
Hygiene
Last Supper
Latter Day Saint ordinances, rituals, and symbolism
Latter Day Saint temple practices
Ritual purity in Christianity
Sacraments
Water and religion